Dominique Orliac (born March 15, 1952 in Palaiseau, Essonne) was a member of the National Assembly of France.  She represented the constituency of the Lot Département, and is a member of the Radical Party of the Left. She lost her seat in the 2017 Parliamentary Elections.

References

1952 births
Living people
People from Palaiseau
Radical Party of the Left politicians
Politicians from Occitania (administrative region)
Women members of the National Assembly (France)
Deputies of the 13th National Assembly of the French Fifth Republic
Deputies of the 14th National Assembly of the French Fifth Republic
21st-century French women politicians
French ophthalmologists